Toudoukan (Japanese:闘道館), is a professional wrestling,  MMA and fighting  sports memorabilia store and event space in Bunkyō, Tokyo, Japan. The store is known as the mecca for pro wrestling goods.

Information 

The shop was opened in 2001 in the Bunkyō ward of Tokyo by Takashi Izumi. The location is notable as the area has other professional wrestling landmarks including the Tokyo Dome, Korakuen Hall and  New Japan Pro Wrestling's Toukon shop within walking distance. The shop was initially opened as a professional wrestling version of a  manga cafe where you could drink, eat and either read wrestling books or watch wrestling videos. In order to build a large enough collection for a library, the store started to collect various wrestling items from around the country. During this process, Izumi realized that there was a need for a used pro wrestling items store and started selling excess items. Customers found the manga cafe concept confusing and the store became a pro wrestling sports memorabilia store. The shop saw more success after their rebranding and were able to expand to the floor above. The shop moved to a larger building that said to be almost double the size of the original location in 2018. A Japanese Kūdō champion named Kiyohisa Kato, helped commemorate the store's new location by appearing for an event there. The shop hosted a press conference for a Shuji Ishikawa vs Atsushi Onita match in 2019. The shop hosted pro wrestler, Kenoh on Octoher 19th, 2019. The shop co-hosted an art exhibition for "Welfare and Pro Wrestling" in 2021. Tiger Mask made an appearance at the shop in 2022 for a memorial Q&A session on Strong Kobayashi. On January 9th, 2023, the store hosted a Q&A session with former Japanese women's wrestler, Megumi Kudo.

Notable items 

 Wrestling masks unexpectedly became a hot item at the store and over the years, the store has become known for its rare mask collection. The store had a Tiger Mask ring-worn mask from 1981 that has been appraised at ¥5,000,000 ($37,931 USD). Later, blood stained Tiger Mask masks were sold for ¥2,000,000 and ¥3,000,000. The store also has a ring-worn Antonio Inoki robe that was valued at ¥4,400,000, a World Boxing Council official championship belt and  Yoshio Shirai's boxing gloves that were worn during a world title fight against Dado Marino. The store also has an electrified, barbed wire  Japanese rice scooper that was used by Atsushi Onita in a match in 2015.

In popular culture 

Izumi and Toudoukan have been featured multiple times on Japanese television. The store has been featured in  Nippon TV's, Black Wide Show in 2003. The store was featured on  TV Tokyo's,  Good luck! appraisal variety show several times between 2006 and 2016. The store was used in TV Tokyo's serial drama, Walkin' Butterfly in 2008 and was featured on Amazon Prime's Arita Pro Wrestling International in 2020.

References

Retail companies of Japan
Japanese companies established in 2001